José Antônio Moreira, first baron with greatness, viscount with greatness and count of Ipanema, (October 23, 1797 in São Paulo – June 28, 1879 in Rio de Janeiro) was a Brazilian industrialist of the branch of the metallurgy.

Son of José Antônio Moreira and of Ana Joaquina of Jesus. He got married with Rat-colored Laurinda Rosa of the Saints, leaving descendants, of whom there is outstanding José Antônio Moreira Filho, I second baron of Ipanema.

Comendador of the Imperial Order of Christ and dignitary of the Imperial Order of Rosa. It received the baronage for decree of 24 of March 1847, the baron's grandezas for decree of 25 of September 1849, the viscondado with greatness for decree of 2 of December 1854 and the county for decree of 20 of February 1868. It makes reference to the river Ipanema, to which edges the noble raised the Factory from Iron of Ipanema, in Sorocaba.

References

18th-century Brazilian people
19th-century Brazilian people
Brazilian nobility